Atama no Taisou (lit. Head Gymnastics) is a puzzle collecting books series that was released by Kobunsha, and the author is Akira Tago. As of 2010, there were 23 regular volumes with an e-book volume released.

The first volume was published in 1966 and sold more than 2.5 million. The series has sold 12 million copies and become a best-seller in that year.

References 

1966 books
Japanese books
Quiz games
Books about games